Swanne Gauthier (born 6 August 1986 in Pamiers) is a French basketball player who played for top French league Ligue Féminine de Basketball clubs Tarbes during the 2002-2003 season and Toulouse Metropole Basket during the 2009-2010 season.

References

French women's basketball players
People from Pamiers
1986 births
Living people
Sportspeople from Ariège (department)